Tachyporini is a tribe of rove beetle in the subfamily Tachyporinae. It contains the genera Tachyporus and Tachinus, among others.

References

Tachyporinae
Beetle tribes